Bosöns IK was a sports club in Bosön, Sweden. The club won the Swedish women's national volleyball championship in 1962, 1963, 1964, 1966 and 1967.

References

Sport in Stockholm County
Swedish volleyball clubs